The 2013 KNSB Dutch Super Sprint Championships in speed skating were held at De Uithof The Hague at 2 February 2013. It was the 23rd edition of this championships.

The seniors and the juniors in category A skate a combination, called "pure sprint", over the distances 100m, 300m and 500m. The juniors in category B and C skate a combination, called "supersprint", over the distances 2x100m and 2x300m. The resulting times have been measured in seconds and then converted to points, using the average times on 100 meter units; thus the number of points for a 300 meters race is the time in seconds divided by three; for the 500 meters, the time in seconds is divided by five. Points are calculated to three decimal places and truncation is applied; the numbers are not rounded. All points are added up; the lower the score the better.

Medalists

References

External links
 Results on www.speedskatingnews.info

KNSB Dutch Super Sprint Championships
KNSB Dutch Super Sprint Championships
2013 Super Sprint
Sports competitions in The Hague